The Dapingian is the third stage of the Ordovician period and the first stage of the Middle Ordovician series. It is preceded by the Floian and succeeded by the Darriwilian. The top of the Floian is defined as the first appearance of the conodont species Baltoniodus triangularis which happened about  million years ago. The Dapingian lasted for about 2.7 million years until about  million years ago.

History
The Ordovician was divided into three series and six global stages in 1995; in 2005, this was amended to seven stages with the formalization of the Hirnantian stage as the last stage in the Late Ordovician. The Dapingian was the last Ordovician stage to be ratified, and was initially referred to as an informal and unnamed "third stage" corresponding to the early part of the Middle Ordovician. This third stage was meant to represent the appearance of several major index fossils. The conodont Baltoniodus triangularis, a species found in Baltica and China, defined the base of the regional Baltic Volkhov stage. Another conodont, Tripodus laevis, defined the base of the Whiterockian stage in western North America. T. laevis was also roughly correlated with the appearance of Isograptus v. lunatus, an abundant worldwide graptolite.

The Whiterock Narrows section in the Ninemile Formation of Nevada was the initial suggestion for the GSSP of the third stage, but a 2001 review of the site revealed that its local conodont fauna was misaligned with wider graptolite zonation. In its place, two formal GSSP candidates were proposed. The Niquivil section of Argentina used another widespread species, Protoprioniodus (Cooperignathus) aranda, as a proxy for B. triangularis, T. laevis, and graptolites, which were absent from the section. The Huanghuachang section of China hosted a more diverse fauna of index fossils, including Baltoniodus triangularis and biostratigraphically useful graptolites and chitinozoans. The Huanghuachang section was approved as the GSSP for the third stage in 2006, and was ratified by the ICS in 2007.

Naming 
The Dapingian is named after Daping, a village that lies near the Dapingian GSSP at Huanghuachang. Daping is very close to an outcrop with similar rocks, the "Chenjiahe section" (formerly "Daping section") in Chenjiahe. The name of the Dapingian stage was introduced in 2007 and approved alongside the stage's ratification, beating out earlier suggestions such as "Volkhovian" and "Huanghuachangian".

GSSP

The Global Boundary Stratotype Section and Point (GSSP) of the Dapingian is the Huanghuachang section, in Huanghuachang, Yichang, China. It is an outcrop of the Dawan Formation. The lower boundary is defined as the first appearance of the conodont species Baltoniodus triangularis in the type section. Radiometric dating has constrained the Floian-Dapingian boundary at  million years ago. The exact boundary lies 10.57 m above the base of Dawan Formation.

Regional stages
The Dapingian overlaps with the upper part of the Arenig, a geologic stage used in England. It is also equivalent to the lower part of the North American Whiterockian stage, most of the Baltic/Russian Volkhov stage, and the Castlemainian and Yapeenian stages which have been used in Australia and Scandinavia.

References

 

Ordovician geochronology